Epinotia granitalis, the cypress bark moth, is a moth of the family Tortricidae. It is endemic to Japan.

The wingspan is 13–16 mm. Adults are on wing from early June to late July.

The larvae feed on Cryptomeria japonica and Chamaecyparis obtusa. The larvae bore into the bark and feed on the phloem of a standing tree. The cambium is injured, but since the damaged area is only small, the callus soon heals the damaged part and the tree continues to grow normally, but the scar and discolouration remain and increase annually. These scars lead to a degradation in the commercial value of the timber.

External links
Eurasian Tortricidae

Olethreutinae
Moths described in 1881
Taxa named by Arthur Gardiner Butler
Moths of Japan